Oregon Route 230 is an Oregon state highway which runs along the western edge of Crater Lake National Park, in rural Douglas County, Oregon.

Route description
OR 230 begins, at its southern (or "western") terminus, at an intersection with Oregon Route 62 near Union Creek.  It heads north, skirting along the western edge of the park.  The highway terminates at an intersection with Oregon Route 138 just south of Diamond Lake.

The highway does not provide any access to Crater Lake National Park directly; however, the park can be accessed via either OR 62 (all year) or OR 138 (during the summer, when the North Entrance to the park is open).

Major intersections

References

External links

230
Transportation in Jackson County, Oregon
Transportation in Douglas County, Oregon